Phytosulfokines are  plant hormones that belong to the growing class of plant peptide hormones. Phytosulfokines are sulfated growth factors strongly promoting proliferation of plant cells in cultures.

References

Plant peptide hormones